Le Havre Athletic Club (commonly referred to as Le Havre) is a French association football club based in Le Havre, Normandy. The football club was founded in 1894 as a section of the sports club of the same name, founded in 1884.

Le Havre is one of the oldest French football clubs, but the oldest is Standard Athletic Club of Paris.
Le Havre plays in Ligue 2, the second tier of French football, and plays its home matches at the Stade Océane.

Le Havre made its football debut in France's first-ever championship in 1899 and, on its debut, became the first French club outside Paris to win the league. The club won the league the following season in 1900. Le Havre has yet to win the current first division of French football, Ligue 1, but has participated in the league 24 times; its last stint being during the 2008–09 season. The club's highest honour to date was winning the Coupe de France in 1959.

The main rivalries of Le Havre are the "Derby Normand" with SM Caen and an always heated clash with Lens, located in the region of Nord-Pas-de-Calais.

History 

It was in 1884 that a group of British residents formed Le Havre Athlétique, which played a hybrid form of football, a cross between rugby and association football, called "combination".
The oldest French football club is Standard Athletic Club founded by British in Paris.

Association football began being played in Le Havre in 1894.

In 1899, Le Havre became the first club from outside Paris to become French football champions. At the time the championship was organised by the USFSA. After being awarded a win over Iris Club Lillois in the semi-final by walkover, they were awarded the title after also receiving a walkover in the final against Club Français. They would also win the following year, with the final being a "re-match" of the forfeited 1899 final.

The club is famous for its notable youth investment program which develops and nurtures young talent, with the vision of using them in the first team if they show enough promise. A vast amount of good young talent has gone on to make an impact at international level including Benjamin Mendy, Ibrahim Ba, Jean-Alain Boumsong, Lassana Diarra, Riyad Mahrez, Steve Mandanda, Vikash Dhorasoo, Paul Pogba and Dimitri Payet.

The club was on the receiving end of some high-profile illegal transfers, by which Charles N'Zogbia, Matthias Lepiller and Paul Pogba were signed by other clubs, allegedly without the proper compensation being paid. The first two were arbitrated by FIFA, who ordered Newcastle United and Fiorentina to pay training compensation.

Club culture 
Le Havre is known as 'les ciel et marine' in France, which translates as 'the sky and navy blues'. These colours were chosen by the club's English founders as they were those of their alma maters, the universities of Oxford and Cambridge: the anthem of the club is played to the melody of "God Save the Queen" to mark the English origins of the club:

"A jamais le premier
de tous les clubs français
ô H.A.C.
Fiers de tes origines
Fils d'Oxford et Cambridge
deux couleurs font notre prestige
Ciel et marine!"

English translation:

"The first ever
of all French clubs
The H.A.C
Proud of your roots
Son of Oxford and Cambridge
two colours make our prestige
(the colours of the) sky and the sea!"

Players

Current squad

Out on loan

Honours 

Ligue 2
Winners (5): 1938, 1959, 1985, 1991, 2008
Runners-up (1): 1950
Coupe de France
Winners (1): 1959
Runners-up (1): 1920
USFSA Championnat
Winners (3): 1899, 1900, 1919
Challenge international du Nord
Winners (1): 1900
Coupe Nationale
Winners (2): 1918, 1919
Challenge des Champions
Winners (1): 1959

Club Staff

Managerial history

References

External links

 
Football clubs in Normandy
French rugby union clubs
Football clubs in France
Sport in Le Havre
Ligue 1 clubs